Gaya is a city, municipal corporation and the administrative headquarters of Gaya district and Magadh division of the Indian state of Bihar. The city is surrounded on three sides by small, rocky hills (Mangla-Gauri, Shringa-Sthan, Ram-Shila, and Brahmayoni), with the Phalgu River on its eastern side.

It is a city of historical significance and is one of the major tourist attractions in India. Gaya is sanctified in the Jain, Hindu, and Buddhist religions. Gaya district is mentioned in the great epics, the Ramayana and the Mahabharata. It is the place where Rama, with Sita and Lakshmana, came to offer piṇḍadāna for their father, Dasharatha, and continues to be a major Hindu pilgrimage site for the piṇḍadāna ritual. Bodh Gaya, where Buddha is said to have attained enlightenment, is one of the four holy sites of Buddhism.

Gaya was chosen as one of twelve heritage cities to benefit from the Government of India's four-year Heritage City Development and Augmentation Yojana (HRIDAY) scheme for urban planning, economic growth and heritage conservation projects.

The Mahabodhi Temple complex at Bodh Gaya is a World Heritage Site.

Etymology

Gaya is named after the demon Gayasura (meaning "the demon Gaya") who dwelt the area during the Treta Yuga. According to Vayu Purana, Gaya was the name of a demon (Asura) whose body became pious after he performed strict penance and secured blessings from Lord Vishnu. It was said that the body of Gayasura was transformed into the series of rocky hills that make up the landscape of Gaya.

History

Ancient history
According to modern scholars, the Kikata kingdom from Rigvedic period was located at Gaya, Bihar.

Gaya is an ancient city, with a Buddhist documented history dating back to the 6th century BCE when the sage Gautama Buddha attained enlightenment at Bodh Gaya,  from the modern city.

Even before this time, Gaya was a place of pilgrimage for people from around the world. The fame of ancient Gaya derived from the account in the Ramayana of the god Rama coming here to the banks of Phalgu River (called the Niranjana), accompanied by his wife and younger brother, to offer pind-daan for their father Dasharatha, for the moksha of his soul. In the Mahabharata, Gaya is referred to as Gayapuri.

Gaya flourished during the Maurya Empire (321–187 BCE), which ruled from the city of Pataliputra (adjacent to modern Patna) over an area that extended beyond the Indian subcontinent. During this period, Gaya witnessed the rise and fall of many dynasties in the Magadha region, where it occupied an important place in cultural history over some 2,400 years between the 6th century BCE and the 18th century CE.

The city's cultural significance began with the dynasty founded by Sisunaga, who exercised power over Patna and Gaya around 600 BCE. Bimbisara, fifth king of the dynasty, who lived and ruled around 519 BCE, had projected Gaya to the outer world. Having attained an important place in the history of civilization, the area experienced the influence of Gautama Buddha and Bhagwan Mahavir during the reign of Bimbisara. After a brief period under the Nanda dynasty (345–321 BCE), Gaya and the entire Magadha region came under Mauryan rule. Mauryan Emperor Ashoka (272–232 BCE) embraced and promoted Buddhism. He visited Gaya, and built the first temple at Bodh Gaya to commemorate the Buddha's attainment of supreme enlightenment.

The period of Hindu revivalism began with the Gupta Empire during the 4th and 5th centuries CE. Samudragupta of Magadha brought Gaya into the limelight, making it the capital of Bihar district during the Gupta empire.

In 750 CE, Gaya became a part of the Pala Empire, under the rule of its founder, Gopala. It is believed that the present temple of Bodh Gaya was built during the reign of Gopala's son, Dharmapala.

In the 12th century CE, Gaya was invaded by Muhammad Bakhtiyar Khilji of the Ghaznavid Empire. By 1557, it had become part of the Mughal Empire, and remained under its power until the Battle of Buxar and the beginning of British rule in 1764. Gaya, along with other parts of the country, gained its independence in 1947.

Modern history

As attested by Francis Buchanan-Hamilton in the early nineteenth century, the city was divided into two areas: a sacred area in the southern part of the city, called Gaya; and the larger secular area, which may have been known by the Muslim community as Allahabad. During the British rule, the commercial and administrative area of the secular zone was formally named Saheb Ganj by British policy reformer Thomas Law, who was a district officer in Gaya in the late nineteenth century. Now 2023 Upgrade Gaya Junction to International Junction official news launched By @PIB_Patna on Twitter 

Swami Sahajanand Saraswati, founder of the All India Kisan Sabha peasant movement in 1936, established an ashram at Neyamatpur, Gaya, which later became the centre of the freedom struggle in Bihar. Many prominent leaders of the Indian National Congress visited frequently to meet Yadunandan (Jadunandan) Sharma when he was leader of Kisan Sabha, residing in the ashram set up by Swamiji. Yadunandan Sharma became the leader of the peasants of Gaya district and second-in-command to Swami Sahajanand Saraswati.

Gaya played a significant role in the Indian Independence Movement. From 26 to 31 December 1922, the 37th session of the Indian National Congress was held in Gaya under the presidency of Deshbandhu Chittaranjan Das. It was attended by prominent leaders and luminaries of the Independence Movement, including Mohandas K. Gandhi, Dr. Rajendra Prasad, Dr. Anugrah Narayan Sinha, Sardar Patel, Maulana Azad, Jawaharlal Nehru and Sri Krishna Sinha.

Gaya is the birthplace of eminent nationalist Bihar Vibhuti, Anugrah Narayan Sinha, Bihar's first deputy Chief Minister and Finance Minister. Former Bihar Chief Minister Satyendra Narayan Sinha also hailed from Gaya. Ishwar Chaudhary, a member of the Fifth, Sixth and Ninth Lok Sabhas from 1971 to 1979 and from 1989 to 1991, represented the Gaya constituency of Bihar.

Administration
Until 1864, Gaya was a part of the district of Behar and Ramgarh (now in the state of Jharkhand). It became a district of Bihar in its own right on 3 October 1865. In May 1981, the Bihar state government created the Magadh division, comprising the district of Gaya, along with Nawada, Aurangabad and Jehanabad, all of which had originally been sub-divisions when Gaya district was created. Aurangabad and Nawada were partitioned from the territory of Gaya in 1973; and Jehanabad in 1988. Gaya district occupies an area of 4,976 km2 (1,921-mile2).

Gaya Municipal Corporation (GMC) is the civic body that governs Gaya. GMC consists of democratically elected members, is headed by a mayor, who administer the city's infrastructure, public services, and supplies. As of 2021, the corporation is headed by Virendra Kumar and Deputy mayor Mohan Shrivastava.

Culture

Pilgrimage

The city of Gaya is a holy place of Hinduism, with a great number of Hindu deities represented in the engravings, paintings and carvings of its shrines. Of particular importance are the sites in the city associated with Vishnu, in particular the Phalgu River and the shrine Vishnupad Mandir, or Vishnupada, which is marked by a large footprint of Lord Vishnu engraved in a basalt block. Gaya is the location at which Rama, with Sita and Lakshmana, offered pind-daan for his father, Dasharatha. Gaya has since remained a site of key importance for the performance of the pind-daan ritual.

Gaya is considered to be one of the most ideal places to perform the Śrāddha. (A Śrāddha is the Hindu ritual that one performs to pay homage to one's ancestors, especially to one's dead parents). As per Hindu belief system, it is believed that a person goes to hell if he dies in the following circumstances - if he meets an accidental death, if he dies without his consecrations being performed, or if he is killed by a wild animal. But, if Śrāddha of that person are performed at Gaya then the soul of such a man will get rid of the tortures of the hell and will go to heaven. Performing Śrāddha here is of great importance as it helps one to get rid of pitra rinna i.e. debts towards one's ancestors (male forefathers).

Nearby Bodh Gaya ("Buddha Gaya"), so named to distinguish it from the Hindu town centre of Gaya, is one of the four holiest sites of Buddhism and the site where the Buddha attained enlightenment.

World Heritage Site at Bodh Gaya

The Mahabodhi Temple Complex at Bodh Gaya was listed as a World Heritage Site by the World Heritage Committee of the United Nations Educational, Scientific and Cultural Organization (UNESCO) at its 26th session, on 26 June 2002.

The  Mahabodhi Temple central to the complex was first built by the emperor Ashoka in the 3rd century BCE. The main part of the present structure dates from the 5th–6th centuries CE. It is one of the earliest and best-preserved Buddhist temples built entirely of brick dating from the later Gupta period. The Bodhi Tree (Ficus religiosa), the most important of the sacred places within the complex, is reputedly a descendant of the original tree under which Siddhārtha Gautama attained enlightenment and became the Buddha. Marking this seminal moment, Bodh Gaya is one of the four holiest pilgrimage sites of Buddhism, with Lumbini, Sarnath and Kushinagar.

The various structures on the site have undergone a number of restorations over the centuries. Ongoing maintenance and management is required to protect the complex which, as a major pilgrimage site, is under pressure due to large numbers of visitors. The site is under the responsibility of the state government of Bihar, and is managed by the Bodhgaya Temple Management Committee (BTMC) and advisory board under the Bodh Gaya Temple Act, 1949.

Climate
As Gaya is surrounded by hills on three sides and river on the fourth side, the climate of Gaya is seasonable. Climate is characterised by relatively high temperatures and evenly distributed rainfall throughout the year.  The Köppen Climate Classification sub-type for this climate is "Cwa" (humid subtropical).

Economy
Gaya is the second-largest contributor to the economy of Bihar, after Patna. Agriculture is the leading economic activity of the district. The main crops grown are rice, wheat, potatoes, and lentils. Livestock raised include cattle, buffaloes, goats and pigs. Gaya has a large number of household industries, producing incense sticks (atagarbatti), local sweets tilkut (made with sesame seed) and lai (made with poppy seed), stone-work, hand weaving, power-loom weaving, textiles and garments, small-scale manufactured goods, and plastic products. Small-scale industries also include agricultural services, metalworking, machinery and equipment production and repair services. The main vegetable market in the city is the Kedarnath Market. Commercial activities are located along its main roads; the city also has a large number of informal shops. As Gaya is an important centre of religious tourism, accommodation is widely available. Bodh Gaya's largest hotel is the Maha Bodhi Hotel, Resort & Convention Centre; the Sambodhi Retreat, a resort of Bihar, is also in the town.

Demographics

The city had its first census in 1872, which placed the figure at 66,843. In the 2011 census, the Gaya Urban Agglomeration had a population of 470,839. The Gaya Urban Agglomeration encompasses the Gaya Municipal Corporation, Kaler (Out Growth), and Paharpur (Census Town). the Gaya Municipal Corporation had a total population of 468,614, of whom 247,572 were male and 221,042 were female. The population below 5 years was 59,669. The sex ratio was 986 women to 1000 men. The literacy rate for the population aged 7 and over was 85.74%.

Villages
 
 
Keori, between Gaya and Patna
Ulle
Barachatti

Transport

Local transport
There are many city buses and taxis providing services across the city and Bodh Gaya. Tangas, auto rickshaws, and cycle rickshaws also ply the city and Bodh Gaya. The main bus stands are Government Bus Stand, Sikaria More Bus Stand, Gaurkashni Bus Stand (Manpur), and Delha Bus Stand. Local transport is reliable, and auto rickshaws are available for various destinations in the city. The Gaya–Patna railway line plays a major role in transporting people from the town to the state capital.

Roadways 
Gaya has a road network providing good connectivity with the state of Bihar and other parts of the country. Regular direct bus services run from Gaya to Patna, Bhagalpur, Munger, Nalanda, Rajgir, Varanasi, Ranchi, Jamshedpur, Hazaribagh, Durgapur, Asansol, Kolkata and Dhanbad. In 2011,  Mercedes-Benz luxury services were introduced by Bihar State Road Transport Corporation for Muzaffarpur, Patna, Munger, Bhagalpur, Motihari, Hazaribagh, Koderma, and Ramgarh.

This road, known as National Highway 2 before 2010, is now called National Highway 19. It connects Gaya to Patna, Dhanbad, Ranchi, Jamshedpur, Bokaro, Rourkela, Durgapur, Kolkata (495 km), Varanasi (252 km), Allahabad, Kanpur, Delhi, Amritsar, and to the Pakistani cities of Lahore and Peshawar. Gaya is connected to Patna (105 km) by National Highway 22 (formerly NH 83), and to Nawada, Rajgir (78 km) and Bihar Sharif by NH 120. Construction work began in 2014 on the road from Patna to Dobhi via Gaya and Gaya to Bihar Sharif to create a four-lane highway with additional road and bridge infrastructure. Completion of the project, originally due in April 2018, has been delayed.

Railways 

Gaya is connected to the rest of India by roads, rail and airways. The Grand Chord section of the Indian Railways passes through Gaya. Gaya Junction railway station railway station is a major junction station serving the city. Gaya Junction has been redeveloped as Model railway station recently and houses all the major facilities like waiting rooms, computerized reservation facility, food plaza, dormitory, retiring rooms, cafeteria, bookshop, etc. Gaya falls under the jurisdiction of the Mughalsarai railway division of the East Central Railway zone. The Grand Chord rail line that connects Howrah and New Delhi passes through Gaya. It lies between Mughalsarai Junction on the Delhi side and Dhanbad Junction on the Howrah side.

Airways 

Situated between Gaya (7 km) and Bodh Gaya (11 km), Gaya Airport is one of two operating international airports in the states of Bihar and Jharkhand. It is the second-busiest airport in Bihar, after Patna's Jay Prakash Narayan Airport. Gaya airport mainly operates seasonal flights for Buddhist pilgrims to Bodh Gaya from Colombo, Sri Lanka; Bangkok, Thailand; Singapore, and Paro, Bhutan. There are also regular domestic flights to Varanasi, Kolkata and Delhi. The Airports Authority of India has plans to develop Gaya Airport as a stand-by to the Netaji Subhash Chandra Bose International Airport in Kolkata. Gaya Airport also serves as the only place of Bihar from where Hajj pilgrims take direct flight to Makkah and Madina in Saudi Arabia.

Education

Notable institutions of higher education include:
Mirza Ghalib College
Indian Institute of Management Bodh Gaya
Gaya College 
Gaya College of Engineering
Magadh University 
Central University of South Bihar
Anugrah Narayan Magadh Medical College and Hospital

Notable schools:
Nazareth Academy, Gaya

Notable people
Rajesh Kumar
Eqbal Ahmad
Prithvi Shaw
Seyed E. Hasnain
Ashutosh Aman
Tabish Khair
Prem Kumar (politician)
A. K. Narain
Lalit Mohan Sharma
Janki Ballabh Shastri
O. P. Singh

References

External links

 
Hindu pilgrimage sites in India
Buddhist pilgrimage sites in India
Hindu holy cities
Early Buddhism
Gautama Buddha
Cities and towns in Gaya district
Religious tourism
Religious tourism in India
Tourism